The 1948 New Brunswick general election was held on June 28, 1948, to elect 52 members to the 41st New Brunswick Legislative Assembly, the governing house of the province of New Brunswick, Canada. 

The Liberal government of John B. McNair was re-elected.

The election was held using 17 districts, electing between two and five members each, through Block Voting. Carleton, which elected 2 Progressive-Conservatives and a Liberal, was the only district where mixed representation was produced. The rest each produced one-party sweeps.

References

1948 elections in Canada
Elections in New Brunswick
General Election
June 1948 events in North America